ParaHoxozoa (or Parahoxozoa) is a clade of animals that consists of Bilateria, Placozoa, and Cnidaria. The relationship of this clade relative to the two other animal lineages Ctenophora and Porifera is debated. Some phylogenomic studies have presented evidence supporting Ctenophora as the sister to Parahoxozoa and Porifera as the sister group to the rest of animals (e.g. ). Some studies have presented evidence supporting Porifera as the sister to Parahoxozoa and Ctenophora as the sister group to the rest of animals (e.g. ).

Phylogeny
The tree below, which is congruent with the vast majority of these phylogenomic studies, conveys this uncertainty with a polytomy.

ParaHoxozoa or Parahoxozoa 

Though "ParaHox" genes are usually referred to in CamelCase and the original paper that named the clade used "ParaHoxozoa", the single initial cap format "Parahoxozoa" has become more common in the literature as CamelCase is not standard in zoological nomenclature.

Characteristics 

Parahoxozoa was defined by the presence of several gene (sub)classes (HNF, CUT, PROS, ZF, CERS, K50, S50-PRD), as well as Hox/ParaHox-ANTP from which the name of this clade originated. It was later proposed and contested that a gene of the same class (ANTP) as the Hox/ParaHox, the NK gene and the Cdx Parahox gene, is also present in Porifera, the sponges. Regardless of whether a ParaHox gene is ever definitively identified, Parahoxozoa, as originally defined, is monophyletic and therefore continues to be used as such.

Planula-acoel, triploblasty, and bilaterian similarities 
The original Bilateria are hypothesized to be a bottom dwelling worm with a single body opening. A through-gut may already have developed with the Ctenophora however. The through-gut may have developed from the corners of a single opening with lips fusing. E.g. Acoela resemble the planula larvae of some Cnidaria, which exhibit some bilaterian symmetry. They are vermiform, just as the cnidarian Buddenbrockia is. Placozoa has been noted to resemble planula. Usually, "Planulozoa" is to the exclusion of Placozoa, but not necessarily. In this case it appears synonymous with Parahoxozoa. Triploblasty developed before the Cnidaria-Bilateria radiation as well.

References 

Parazoa
Superphyla